Mount Duff, also named Boundary Peak 174, is a mountain in Alaska and British Columbia, located on the Canada–United States border, and part of the Southern Icefield Ranges of the Saint Elias Mountains. It was named in 1923 for Sir Lyman Poore Duff, (1865-1948), a junior counsel before International Boundary Commission in 1903, and Judge of the Supreme Court of Canada.

See also
List of Boundary Peaks of the Alaska-British Columbia/Yukon border

References

Mountains of Alaska
Two-thousanders of British Columbia
Saint Elias Mountains
Canada–United States border
International mountains of North America
Mountains of Yakutat City and Borough, Alaska